Francis Wade Hughes (August 10, 1817October 20, 1885) was an American lawyer and politician from Pennsylvania. He served as a Democratic member of the Pennsylvania Senate for the 8th district from 1843 to 1844.  He served as Secretary of the Commonwealth of Pennsylvania from 1852 to 1853 and as Attorney General of Pennsylvania from 1853 to 1855. Although pro-Union, he was tarred as a secessionist "traitor" in the press during the 1862 elections, ending his political career. During the 1870s, he was the chief prosecutor in the Molly Maguires trials.

Early life and education
Hughes was born the fifth and youngest child of John Hughes and Hannah Bartholomew. He studied law in Pottsville, Schuylkill County and Philadelphia. He was admitted to the bar of Schuylkill County in 1837.

Career
He was appointed Deputy Attorney General of the county in 1839. He would resign three times and be reappointed over the next eleven years.

Hughes was elected to the Pennsylvania Senate for the 8th district and served from 1843 to 1844. In 1852 he was appointed Secretary of the Commonwealth, which he resigned in 1853 to become Attorney General.

As chairman of the 1862 Democratic State Committee, Hughes was singled out for vilification. His family ties in the Confederacy were played up, and worse, a draft resolution he authored (but never introduced) for the 1860 convention, suggesting Pennsylvania might secede, was attacked. Hughes was forced to resign, and never returned to politics.

In 1876 he was the chief prosecutor in the Molly Maguires cases. He had previously never prosecuted homicide cases and frequently defended with success those facing capital punishment.

He is interred at the Charles Baber Cemetery in Pottsville, Pennsylvania.

Personal life
He married Sarah Silliman, of Pottsville, in 1839.

Notes

References

Citations

Bibliography

External links
 * 

|-

1817 births
1885 deaths
19th-century American lawyers
19th-century American politicians
Burials at Charles Baber Cemetery
Pennsylvania Attorneys General
Pennsylvania lawyers
Democratic Party Pennsylvania state senators
People from Montgomery County, Pennsylvania
Politicians from Pottsville, Pennsylvania